Gunnar Neels-Hansson (27 July 1883 – 9 June 1967) was a Norwegian theatre director. He was born in Kristiania to Thora Elisabeth Neelsen and Olaf Mørch Hansson. His daughter Thora Neels-Hansson was married to Per Schwab.

Neels-Hansson was assigned with Stavanger scene as stage director from 1915, and later with Chat Noir. From 1927 to 1950 he was appointed theatre director at NRK's Radioteatret.

References

1883 births
1967 deaths
Theatre people from Oslo
Norwegian theatre directors
NRK people